The Municipality of Prebold is a small municipality in central Slovenia. The seat of the municipality is Prebold. The municipality lies on the edge of the lower Savinja Valley at the northern edge of the Sava Hills west of Celje. The area is part of the traditional region of Styria. The municipality is now included in the Savinja Statistical Region. It is primarily known for growing hops.

Settlements

In addition to the municipal seat of Prebold, the municipality also includes the following settlements:

 Dolenja Vas
 Kaplja Vas
 Latkova Vas
 Marija Reka
 Matke
 Šešče pri Preboldu
 Sveti Lovrenc

References

External links
 
 Municipality Prebold at Geopedia
 Municipality of Prebold website

 
Prebold
1998 establishments in Slovenia